Gerben Karstens (14 January 1942 – 8 October 2022) was a Dutch professional racing cyclist, who won the gold medal in the 100 km team trial at the 1964 Summer Olympics, alongside Bart Zoet, Evert Dolman, and Jan Pieterse. At the same Olympics he finished 27th in the individual road race. Karstens ranks 6th in all-time stage wins in Vuelta a España history.

Biography
After the Olympic Games, Karstens started a successful professional career, where he won six stages in the Tour de France, 14 stages in the Vuelta a España, 1 stage in the Giro d'Italia, and other races such as Paris–Tours and GP Fourmies. He became Dutch national road race champion in 1966.

In the 1974 Tour de France, Karstens finished second in the fourth stage. Afterwards, he forgot to take the doping tests. The tour organisation set him back to the last place of the stage results, and gave him 10 minutes penalty time in the overall classification, which made him lose his third place. One day later, the jury took the penalty time back. Thanks to 5 seconds of bonification that Karstens won during intermediate sprints, he took over the yellow jersey from Eddy Merckx. He wore yellow for one stage before losing it to Patrick Sercu after stage 6A, but he reclaimed the overall lead after stage 6B to spend another stage in Yellow before Merckx took over the lead for the remainder of the Tour.

Karstens died of complications from a stroke on 8 October 2022, at the age of 80.

Major results

1962
Ronde van Limburg
1964
Ronde van Noord-Holland
Ronde van Overijssel
Gold medal 100 km team time trial 1964 Olympic Games
1965
Beveren-Waas
Sint-Amands
Rijen
Essen
Boom
Paris–Tours
Tour de France:
Winner stage 21
1966
Acht van Chaam
Critérium des As
 Dutch National Road Race Championship
Vuelta a España:
Winner stages 12, 15B and 17
Denderleeuw
Eede
Bonheiden
Tour de France:
Winner stages 3B and 9
1967
Saint-Claid
Vuelta a España:
Winner stages 7, 10B, 17 and 18
Hamme
1968
Belsele
Hansweert
Grand Prix de Fourmies
1969
Gap
Rijkevoorsel
Putte-Mechelen
Langemark
1971
Booischot
Heusden
Vuelta a España:
Winner stage 11A
Tour de France:
Winner stage 1B
Born
Koersel
Le Quillo
1972
Pléaux
Ulestraten
Polderpijl
Plessala
1973
Critérium des As
Omloop van het Waasland
Vuelta a España:
Winner stage 2, 5, 7 and 12
Giro d'Italia:
Winner stage 5
Zwijndrecht
Six days of London (with Leo Duyndam)
1974
Nice-Seillans
Tour du Haut Var
Stekene
Vuelta a España:
Winner stage 16
Sint-Amandsberg
Tour de France:
Wearing yellow jersey for two days
1975
Kamerik
Six days of Rotterdam (with Leo Duyndam)
Dongen
1976
Gouden Pijl Emmen
Tour de France:
Winner stages 18C and 22B
Profronde van Pijnacker
Saussignac
Vuelta a España:
Winner stage 12
1977
Dordrecht
Petegem-aan-de-Leie
1978
Leiden
Mijl van Mares

See also
 List of Dutch Olympic cyclists
 List of Dutch cyclists who have led the Tour de France general classification

References

External links 

 

Official Tour de France results for Gerben Karstens

1942 births
2022 deaths
Dutch male cyclists
Cyclists at the 1964 Summer Olympics
Olympic cyclists of the Netherlands
Olympic gold medalists for the Netherlands
Dutch Tour de France stage winners
Dutch Vuelta a España stage winners
Sportspeople from Voorburg
Olympic medalists in cycling
Dutch Giro d'Italia stage winners
Tour de France Champs Elysées stage winners
Tour de Suisse stage winners
Medalists at the 1964 Summer Olympics
UCI Road World Championships cyclists for the Netherlands
Cyclists from South Holland